is a Japanese one-shot web manga written by Tatsuki Fujimoto and illustrated by Oto Toda. It was released on the Shōnen Jump+ website in July 2022.

Publication
Written by Tatsuki Fujimoto and illustrated by Oto Toda, the one-shot was released on Shueisha's Shōnen Jump+ manga website on July 4, 2022.

Viz Media and Manga Plus published the one-shot in English simultaneously with its Japanese release.

Reception
Brian Salvatore from Multiversity Comics praised the story despite the manga's short length, especially for how it left several parts to interpretation; Salvatore also praised Toda's artwork. However, Salvatore felt that the manga tells the reader what to think at times. Kazushi Shimada from  praised the story's message about looking for the deeper meaning in art and Toda's artwork. Shimada also liked that the story was left vague and open to interpretation at points.

See also
 To Strip the Flesh, a manga anthology by Oto Toda

References

External links
  
 

2022 manga
Comedy anime and manga
Mystery anime and manga
One-shot manga
Romance anime and manga
Shōnen manga
Shueisha manga
Viz Media manga